Andrew John Smith (born 11 September 2001) is an English professional footballer who plays as a defender for Grimsby Town, on loan from EFL Championship club Hull City.

Career
Smith was born in Banbury and grew up in the East Riding of Yorkshire. He began his career at Hull City in 2011, and made his first-team debut on 10 August 2021 in the EFL Cup. He moved on loan to Salford City later that month.

On 14 January 2022, Smith was recalled from his loan at Salford City by parent club Hull City and immediately loaned to Grimsby Town for the remainder of the season. Smith played the full 90 minutes of the 2022 National League play-off Final as Grimsby beat Solihull Moors 2–1 at the London Stadium to return to the Football League.

On 28 July 2022, Smith signed a new two-year contract with Hull City, before returning to Grimsby Town on a season-long loan deal.

References

2001 births
Living people
Footballers from the East Riding of Yorkshire
English footballers
Association football defenders
Hull City A.F.C. players
Salford City F.C. players
Grimsby Town F.C. players
National League (English football) players
English Football League players